Vahdatabad-e Mugarmun (also Romanized as Vaḩdatābād-e Mūgarmūn; also known as Deh-e Vaḩdat and Vaḩdat) is a village in Vahdat Rural District, Mugarmun District, Landeh County, Kohgiluyeh and Boyer-Ahmad Province, Iran. At the 2006 census, its population was 226, in 39 families.

References 

Populated places in Landeh County